The discography of Japanese-American musician Beni consists of eight studio albums, two compilation albums, six live albums and three cover albums and twenty-six singles. Beni debuted in 2003 as a member of the Pony Canyon idol group Bishōjo Club 21 under the name Beni Arashiro, and in 2004 made her solo debut with Avex Trax.

In 2008, Beni released the most commercially successful song of her career when she collaborated with rapper Dohzi-T on his song "Mō Ichi do...". The song became a million-certified single by the Recording Industry Association of Japan. During this period, she changed her stage name to the mononym Beni, and signed with Universal Music Japan sublabel Nayutawave Records. Her first studio album with Universal, Bitter & Sweet (2009), was certified gold by the RIAJ.

In 2012, Beni released Covers, an album featuring covers of Japanese songs sung in English, such as Exile's "Ti Amo". The album became the most successful in her career, and spawned two sequels, Covers 2 (2012) and Covers 3 (2013).

Studio albums

Compilation albums

Cover albums

Live albums

Singles

As a lead artist

As a featured artist

Promotional singles

Other charted songs

Other appearances

Notes

References

Discographies of Japanese artists
Pop music discographies